Ramona Straub  (born 19 September 1993) is a German ski jumper, who represents the club SC Langenordnach.

She competed at the 2018 Winter Olympics.

World Championship results

References

External links

1993 births
Living people
German female ski jumpers
Ski jumpers at the 2018 Winter Olympics
Olympic ski jumpers of Germany
FIS Nordic World Ski Championships medalists in ski jumping
21st-century German women